Anikó Ducza-Jánosi (born 8 August 1942) is a retired Hungarian gymnast. She competed at the 1960, 1964 and 1968 Olympics and won a bronze medal in the floor exercise in 1964. She won another bronze medal on the balance beam at the 1962 World Championships.

References

External links

 
 
 

1942 births
Living people
Gymnasts from Budapest
Hungarian female artistic gymnasts
Olympic gymnasts of Hungary
Gymnasts at the 1960 Summer Olympics
Gymnasts at the 1964 Summer Olympics
Gymnasts at the 1968 Summer Olympics
Olympic bronze medalists for Hungary
Olympic medalists in gymnastics
Medalists at the 1964 Summer Olympics
Medalists at the World Artistic Gymnastics Championships
Universiade medalists in gymnastics
Universiade gold medalists for Hungary
Medalists at the 1965 Summer Universiade
20th-century Hungarian women
21st-century Hungarian women